
Gmina Chrostkowo is a rural gmina (administrative district) in Lipno County, Kuyavian-Pomeranian Voivodeship, in north-central Poland.

Villages
Gmina Chrostkowo contains the villages and settlements of Adamowo, Chojno, Chrostkowo, Głęboczek, Gołuchowo, Janiszewo, Kawno, Ksawery, Lubianki, Majdany, Makowiec, Nowa Wieś, Nowe Chrostkowo, Sikórz, Stalmierz and Wildno.

Neighbouring gminas
Gmina Chrostkowo is bordered by the gminas of Brzuze, Kikół, Lipno, Rogowo, Skępe and Zbójno.

References
Polish official population figures 2006

Chrostkowo
Lipno County